Bugulma-Belebey Upland is an upland in the eastern part of Eastern European Plain, west of the Urals, in Tatarstan, Bashkortostan and Orenburg Oblast, Russia. It forms the drainage divide of the Volga, Kama and Belaya rivers. The upper point of the upland is 418 m height. Romashkino field is placed there.

See also
Chatyr-Tau

References

Landforms of Tatarstan
Plains of Russia
Plains of Europe